Sibilla may refer to:

Monte Sibilla, a mountain of Marche, Italy
Italian corvette Sibilla

People with the given name
Sibilla Aleramo (1876–1960), Italian feminist and writer
Sibilla (1954), Italian singer
Sibilla Di Vincenzo (born 1983), Italian racewalker

See also
 Sibila, a village in Mali
 Sibylla (disambiguation)

Italian feminine given names